Siguazodan is a phosphodiesterase inhibitor.

References

Cyanamides
Guanidines
Phosphodiesterase inhibitors